The Ozamiz Airport Road, also known as the Gango Airport Road or Labo Airport Road is a , national secondary road in Misamis Occidental, Philippines. It connects the Ozamiz Airport from Ozamiz–Oroquieta Road. The entire road is designated as National Route 959 (N959) of the Philippine highway network.

References

Roads in Misamis Occidental